German submarine U-476 was a Type VIIC U-boat of Nazi Germany's Kriegsmarine during World War II.

She carried out one patrol. She sank no ships.

She was damaged by a British aircraft northwest of Trondheim on 24 May 1944, then scuttled by a German U-boat on 25 May 1944.

Design
German Type VIIC submarines were preceded by the shorter Type VIIB submarines. U-476 had a displacement of  when at the surface and  while submerged. She had two shafts and two  propellers.

U-476 was fitted with five  torpedo tubes (four fitted at the bow and one at the stern), fourteen torpedoes, one  SK C/35 naval gun, (220 rounds), one  Flak M42 and two twin  C/30 anti-aircraft guns. The boat had a complement of between forty-four and sixty.

Service history
The submarine was laid down on 19 September 1942 at the Deutsche Werke in Kiel as yard number 307, launched on 5 June 1943 and commissioned on 28 July under the command of Oberleutnant zur See Otto Niethmann.

She served with the 5th U-boat Flotilla from 28 July 1943 for training and the 3rd flotilla from 1 April 1944 for operations.

Patrol and loss
U-476s only patrol was preceded by a short trip from Kiel in Germany to Bergen in Norway. The patrol itself began with the boat's departure from Bergen on 20 May 1944.

On the 24th she was attacked by a British PBY Catalina flying boat of No. 210 Squadron RAF. The damage inflicted was so serious that  scuttled the boat with a torpedo the following day. U-990 had also rescued the survivors, but salvation was short-lived; she was sunk later-on, on the 25th.

Thirty-four men went down with U-476; there were twenty-one survivors.

References

Bibliography

External links

German Type VIIC submarines
U-boats commissioned in 1943
U-boats sunk in 1944
U-boats sunk by depth charges
U-boats sunk by German submarines
1943 ships
Ships built in Kiel
World War II submarines of Germany
World War II shipwrecks in the Norwegian Sea
U-boat accidents
Maritime incidents in May 1944